Aishath Inaya (15 May 1968) is a Maldivian singer.

Early life and career
Aishath Inaya is the mother of local performer and musician, Andhala Haleem. Inaya started her career in the music industry in 1987, by performing the song "Keerithi Lha Kujja" for the local band Zero Degree. Afterwards, she lent her voice for songs included in the album series of 4 Hand, followed by several stage shows. In 1995, the Government of Maldives honoured her with the National Award of Recognition. Inaya is mainly known for her soft, melodious and subtle songs. In 2018, she was ranked seventh in the list of the "Most Desired Comeback Voices", compiled by Dho?.

Discography

Feature film

Short film

Television

Non-film songs

Accolades

References 

Living people
People from Malé
1970 births
Maldivian playback singers